Elaiochori (Greek: Ελαιοχώρι) is a village in the municipality of West Achaea, Greece. It is located about 7 km south of Kato Achaia and 23 km southwest of Patras. The nearest larger village is Petrochori, 3 km to the west. The population of Elaiochori was 238 in 2011. Elaiochori is the birthplace of the leader of the military government that ruled the country from 1967 to 1973, Georgios Papadopoulos.

Population

External links
 Elaiochori GTP Travel Pages

See also

List of settlements in Achaea

References

Dymi, Achaea
Populated places in Achaea